Sentinel Rock is a granitic peak in Yosemite National Park, California, United States. It towers over Yosemite Valley, opposite Yosemite Falls.

How it was formed

Sentinel Rock formed when masses of rock split off Yosemite Valley's south-side cliff, along steep joints trending nearly east–west. This formed the near-vertical north face of Sentinel Rock.

Climbing
The most famous climbing route is the Steck-Salathé route, which is rated a  A0.

Climber Derek Hersey died while attempting to free solo climb Sentinel Rock in 1993.

Gallery

References

External links

Mountains of Mariposa County, California
Mountains of Yosemite National Park
Mountains of Northern California
Climbing areas of California